James Leadbetter (born 23 December 1980) is an English former professional snooker player.

Career

Leadbetter was born in 1980, and turned professional in 2003. His début season was without any success, and he dropped off the main tour at the end of the 2003/2004 season, but regained his place in 2006.

The highlight of the 2006/2007 season was a run to the last 64 of the 2007 World Championship, where Leadbetter defeated retired professional Les Dodd 10–8, Chris Norbury 10–9 and Stuart Pettman 10–3, before being defeated 7–10 by former World Champion John Parrott, who that year would reach the last 16 in his final appearance at the Crucible Theatre.

These performances earned Leadbetter £4,500 and ranked him 76th in the world, but this was not enough for him to retain his place on tour for the 2007/2008 season, and he immediately became an amateur once more. His subsequent attempts to re-qualify as a professional that season were unsuccessful, despite a run to the semi-final of one PIOS event in 2008, where he was defeated by Simon Bedford.

Performance and rankings timeline

Career finals

Non-ranking finals: 1

Amateur finals: 2 (1 title)

References

English snooker players
1980 births
Living people